Albissola Marina is a comune (municipality) in the Province of Savona in the Italian region Liguria, located about  west of Genoa and about  northeast of Savona.

History
Albissola Marina was a settlement of the Ingauni (a tribe of the Ligures), later conquered by the Romans and called Alba Docilia (now in the communal territory of Albisola Superiore). During the fall of the Western Roman Empire, barbaric invasions led to the division of the town in two different boroughs, one on the seaside and another at the hills' feet.

In the High Middle Ages it was part of the county of Vado, and then of the marquisate of Savona and that of Albisola (1122). In the early 12th century the two Albissolas founded a joined commune whose main activities included trading, agriculture, fishing and ceramics production; after years of struggle, it went under the Genoese control starting from 1251. In 1343 Albisola, together with the communes of Celle Ligure and Varazze, swore allegiance to the Republic of Genoa, to which they remained (with a certain degree of autonomy) until 1797, when the area was conquered by the Napoleonic troops.

After 1815, Albissola followed the history of the Kingdom of Sardinia and, later, the Kingdom of Italy. It became part of the newly formed province of Savona in 1927.

Main sights
Parish church of Nostra Signora della Concordia (16th century, with an early 20th-century façade). It houses sculptures by Anton Maria Maragliano (17th century)
Oratory of St. Joseph (17th century)
Villa Faraggiana, an 18th-century patrician villa built by the Durazzo family.
Asger Jorn Villa

References

External links

 Official website

Cities and towns in Liguria